Light Breeze is an album by the flugelhornist and composer Franco Ambrosetti which was recorded in 1997 and released on the Enja label the following year.

Reception

In JazzTimes, Patricia Myers stated "The pure tone and graceful fluency of Franco Ambrosetti’s flugelhorn is absolutely enthralling throughout this diverse collection".

Track listing
All compositions by Franco Ambrosetti except where noted
 "Versace" (Daniel Humair) – 6:33
 "Silli's Nest (Interlude 1)" – 1:31
 "Deborah" (Gian Luca Ambrosetti) – 9:02
 "Culture and Sensitivity (Interlude 2)" (John Abercrombie) – 1:43
 "Contempo Latinsky" – 7:13
 "Elegia (Interlude 3)" (Antonio Faraò) – 1:08
 "My Foolish Heart" (Victor Young, Ned Washington) – 7:25
 "Virtuosismo (Interlude 4)" (Miroslav Vitous) – 1:20
 "One for the Kids" (George Gruntz) – 6:01
 "Percussion Dreams (Interlude 5)" (Billy Drummond) – 2:14
 "Giant Steps" (John Coltrane) – 5:53
 "Silli in the Sky" – 5:45

Personnel
Franco Ambrosetti – flugelhorn
John Abercrombie – guitar
Antonio Faraò – piano 
Miroslav Vitous – bass
Billy Drummond – drums

References

Franco Ambrosetti albums
1998 albums
Enja Records albums